Steady On is the fourth album by Contemporary Christian group Point of Grace. It was released in 1998 by Word and Epic Records. It was also the first time they worked with producer Brown Bannister.

Track listing
 "Steady On" (Grant Cunningham, Matt Huesmann) - 4:47
 "My God" (Carla Sullivan) - 4:42
 "Amazing" (Kevin Stokes, David Zaffiro) - 4:54
 "Jesus Is" (Connie Harrington) - 4:16
 "The Wonder Of It All" (Brent Bourgeois, Michael W. Smith) - 4:10
 "Rain Down On Me" (Tony Miracle, Michelle Tumes) - 4:46
 "The Song Is Alive" (Lowell Alexander, Gayla Borders, Jeff Borders) - 4:23
 "Drawing Me Closer" (Lowell Alexander, Gayla Borders, Jeff Borders) - 5:21
 "When The Wind Blows" (Chuck Hargett) - 4:26
 "Saving Grace" (Grant Cunningham, Matt Huesmann) - 4:29
 "Better Days" (Regie Hamm) - 5:06
 "Who Am I" (Christy Nockels, Nathan Nockels) - 3:48

Personnel 

Point of Grace
 Shelley Breen – vocals 
 Denise Jones – vocals 
 Terry Jones – vocals 
 Heather Payne – vocals 

Musicians
 Shane Keister – Wurlitzer electric piano (1), Hammond B3 organ (2, 11), keyboards (3, 4, 10, 11), acoustic piano (10)
 Dennis Patton – keyboards (1, 2, 5), additional keyboards (3, 6, 10), programming (9)
 Michael W. Smith – keyboards (5)
 Tony Miracle – programming (6)
 Blair Masters – additional keyboards (11)
 Gordon Kennedy – guitars (1), electric guitar (2, 3, 4, 7, 8, 10, 11), acoustic guitar (8)
 Jerry McPherson – guitars (1), electric guitar (2-5, 7, 10), acoustic guitar (3, 8)
  Chris Rodriguez – guitars (1), acoustic guitar (2, 3, 8), electric guitar (4)
 Tom Hemby – acoustic guitar (2, 4, 8, 12)
 Scott Denté – acoustic guitar (7, 10)
 Phil Madeira – lap steel guitar (7, 10), Hammond B3 organ (8), electric guitar (8)
 Kenny Greenberg – electric guitar (11)
 Leland Sklar – bass (1-5, 7, 8, 10, 11, 12)
 Steve Brewster – drums (1, 2, 3, 7, 8, 10), percussion (12)
 Chad Cromwell – drums (4, 5, 11)
 Paul Leim – drums (9)
 Eric Darken – percussion (1, 2, 3, 6), tambourine (5)
 Carl Marsh – string arrangements (5, 9)
 Carl Gorodetzky – string contractor (5, 9)
 The Nashville String Machine – strings (5, 9)
 Chris Eaton – vocal arrangements (1, 3, 4, 6, 7, 8, 10, 11)
 Brent Bourgeois – vocal arrangements (2-5, 9, 12)

Production 
 Brown Bannister – producer 
 Brent Bourgeois – A&R direction 
 Linda Bourne Wornell – A&R coordination
 Steve Bishir – recording, mixing (1, 3, 4, 6, 8, 10, 11)
 David Thoener – mixing (2, 5, 7, 9)
 Dan Marnien – mixing (8, 12)
 Russ Long – additional engineer 
 Hank Nirider – additional engineer, assistant engineer, mix assistant 
 Greg Parker – mix assistant 
 Cory Fite – digital editing 
 Bob Ludwig – mastering
 Traci Sterling Bishir – production manager 
 Beth Lee – art direction 
 Chuck Hargett – design 
 Michael Haber – photography 
 Melissa Schleicher – hair, make-up 
 Melanie Shelley – hair, make-up
 Mike Atkins – management 

Studios
 Recorded at The Dugout and Sound Emporium (Nashville, Tennessee).
 Mixed at Seventeen Grand Studio (Nashville, Tennessee) and The Sound Kitchen (Franklin, Tennessee).
 Edited at Wavepoint Digital (Nashville, Tennessee).
 Mastered at Gateway Mastering (Portland, Maine).

Singles
 "Steady On" - #1
 "Saving Grace" -#1
 "When The Wind Blows" - #1
 "The Wonder Of It All" - #1
 "My God" - #1
 "The Song Is Alive" - #1

Music videos
 "Steady On"

References

Point of Grace albums
1998 albums
Albums produced by Brown Bannister